The Netherlands has several levels of administrative subdivisions. The first level of subdivision consists of 12 provinces. The second level of subdivision consists of 342 municipalities.

The country is also subdivided into 21 water districts, governed by a water board (waterschap or hoogheemraadschap), each having authority in matters concerning water management. Direct elections of the water boards take place every four years.

Group of provinces 

The Group of provinces is a European subdivision of the Netherlands. It meets the needs of Eurostat, the European statistical institute, which has defined a classification of territorial units for statistics. These groups correspond to the first European statistical level (NUTS 1).

There are four of them: Northern Netherlands, Eastern Netherlands, Western Netherlands and Southern Netherlands.

Provinces

COROP regions 

A COROP region is a division of the Netherlands for statistical purposes, used by Statistics Netherlands, among others. These divisions are also used in the EU designation as NUTS 3.

Water boards 

Typically, a water board's territory is made up of one or more polders or watersheds. The territory of a water board generally covers several municipalities and may even include areas in two or more provinces. As of 2021, there are 21 water boards in The Netherlands.

 Waterschap Noorderzijlvest (Groningen, Friesland and Drenthe)
 Wetterskip Fryslân (Friesland and Groningen)
 Waterschap Hunze en Aa's (Groningen and Drenthe)
 Waterschap Drents Overijsselse Delta (Drenthe and Overijssel)
 Waterschap Vechtstromen (Drenthe and Overijssel)
 Waterschap Vallei en Veluwe (Utrecht and Gelderland)
 Waterschap Rijn en IJssel (Gelderland)
 Hoogheemraadschap De Stichtse Rijnlanden (Utrecht and South Holland)
 Waterschap Amstel, Gooi en Vecht (North Holland, Utrecht and South Holland)
 Hoogheemraadschap Hollands Noorderkwartier (North Holland)
 Hoogheemraadschap van Rijnland (South Holland and North Holland)
 Hoogheemraadschap van Delfland (South Holland)
 Hoogheemraadschap van Schieland en de Krimpenerwaard (South Holland)
 Waterschap Rivierenland (South Holland, Gelderland, Utrecht and North Brabant)
 Waterschap Hollandse Delta (South Holland)
 Waterschap Scheldestromen (Zeeland)
 Waterschap Brabantse Delta (North Brabant)
 Waterschap De Dommel (North Brabant)
 Waterschap Aa en Maas (North Brabant)
 Waterschap Limburg (Limburg)
 Waterschap Zuiderzeeland (Flevoland)

Municipalities 

As of 1 January 2023, there are 342 municipalities. Municipalities are the second-level administrative division in the Netherlands and are subdivisions of their respective provinces. Their duties are delegated to them by the central government and they are ruled by a municipal council that is elected every four years. Municipal mergers have reduced the total number of municipalities by two-thirds since the first official boundaries were created in the mid 19th century. Municipalities themselves are informally subdivided into districts and neighbourhoods for administrative and statistical purposes.

References 

 
Netherlands